Akhiya or Akhi Brotherhoods (from the Arabic اخي, “my brother”) were the Sufi guilds of young men dedicated to the betterment of the community focused around Anatolia, in the lands that would become the Ottoman Empire. Present beginning around the time of the Seljuk breaking of the Sultanate of Rum in the thirteenth century, these organizations would provide an organizational force in what were largely loosely hinterlands.

Etymology

The term akhi, derived from the Arabic word for brother, carries a particular religious connotation derived from the Quran, which instructs “the believers are but brothers.”  Specifically, the brother was the leader of the organization, as chosen by his fellow members, who were known as fityan (youths). Ibn Battuta, in his travels through Anatolia, identifies the Akhiya and Futuwwa (Order of Youth, Chivalry) as interchangeable terms, both of which described the same work being done.

Organization

Akhi groups in what would become Ottoman lands were centered around a lodge or hospice, where the members of the group would reside and partake in communal living and rituals. These rituals would have a distinctly religious element, with the Sufi traditions that distinguished Anatolia from much of the orthodox Sunni world at the time in full presence as the power of the Sultanate of Rum receded. The hospice would also serve as a guesthouse for travelers, with hospitality being perhaps the most important virtue to the members.
	
It would be nearly impossible to overstate the extent of the influence these lodges had on the region during the Beylikate Period in Anatolia. Ibn Battuta observed during his travels in the region that “in every district, town, and village, there are to be found members of the organization". G.G. Arnakis identifies the organizations as being at least partially responsible for the relative peace that broke out after the Seljuk conquest. In areas where imperial power, be it of the Ottomans, other beyliks, or the Seljuks, barely radiated beyond the court, these groups provided stability and organization to towns that would otherwise be unimaginable. As apt to kill off corrupt and tyrannical police as they were to debate captured Christian archbishops, the Akhiya served to protect their communities and faith at a time where the boundaries between principalities were loose at best.
	
As the Ottomans under Orhan began to consolidate power, they began to absorb many of the functions of the brotherhoods, leaving them intact while the empire remained nascent. The brotherhoods would form the core of Ottoman communities, afforded an elite status and respect by the imperial court in exchange for their irreplaceable position in the social fabric. While later Sultans would seek to crush the political power of the Akhiya, their communal influence would remain for essentially the entire length of the Ottoman Period, taking on a role identified by some observers as resembling European Freemasonry, with a focus turning to social bonds and cooperation between workers.

See also
 Ahis

References 

Anatolia
Economy of the Ottoman Empire
Land management in the Ottoman Empire
Islamic economics
Guilds in Turkey